The Japanese Friendship Garden is a walled section of Kelley Park in San Jose, California, United States. Dedicated in October 1965, it is patterned after Japan's famous Korakuen Garden in Okayama (one of San Jose's sister cities) and spans six acres. Its three main ponds were stocked with koi sent from Okayama in 1966. The ponds are at different elevations in the park, and are inter-connected by streams.

The park is open daily from 10 AM to 7 PM. There is no admission fee, but the city does charge for parking at Kelley Park.

History
In 2009 a deadly fish virus killed 90% of the Koi in the ponds. 

In 2017 the Coyote Creek flooded the Japanese Friendship Gardens submerging the lower pond and most of the tea house. The main pumps for the three Koi ponds were damaged. The tea house and park's restrooms remained closed to the public pending repairs. As of 2022, the tea house is repaired, while other repairs from the flood remain incomplete.

Gallery

References
City of San Jose Department of Parks, Recreation and Neighborhood Services Japanese Friendship Garden Web page
Trip Advisor

References

See also 
 List of botanical gardens in the United States
 Japanese garden

Parks in San Jose, California
Japanese friendship gardens
Japanese gardens in California
1965 establishments in California